Sims is an unincorporated community in Montgomery County, Arkansas, United States. Sims has a post office with ZIP code 71969.

Education 
Public education for elementary and secondary school students is provided by the Mount Ida School District or the Ouachita River School District, which leads to graduation from Mount Ida High School or Oden High School.

References

Unincorporated communities in Montgomery County, Arkansas
Unincorporated communities in Arkansas